The Grand River Gargoyles (previously Guelph Gargoyles) is an amateur Australian rules football club playing out of Margaret Greene Park in Guelph, Ontario, Canada.  The club draws from individuals from Guelph, Kitchener, Waterloo, Cambridge, Milton and other Southwestern Ontario cities.  
They are the only Aussie Rules club to represent the region. The club began in 2001 and plays in the AFL Ontario along with 9 other clubs from Toronto, Hamilton and Ottawa.

References

External links
Official Grand River Gargoyles website

Sport in Guelph
Australian rules football clubs in Canada
Ontario Australian Football League clubs
2001 establishments in Ontario
Australian rules football clubs established in 2001